Private John C. Ewing (March 4, 1843 – May 23, 1918) was an American soldier who fought for the United States in the American Civil War. Ewing received the country's highest award for bravery during combat, the Medal of Honor, for his action during the Third Battle of Petersburg in Virginia on 2 April 1865. He was honored with the award on 20 May 1865.

Biography
Ewing was born in Ligonier Valley in Pennsylvania on 4 March 1843. He enlisted in Company E of the 211th Pennsylvania Infantry on 12 September 1864, mustering out at the end of the war on 2 June 1865.

Ewing became a member of the Medal of Honor Legion in the 1890s, and marched with it in the ceremonies at the dedication of Grant's Tomb.

He died on 23 May 1918 and his remains are interred at the Ligonier Valley Cemetery in Pennsylvania.

Medal of Honor citation

See also

List of American Civil War Medal of Honor recipients: A–F

References

1843 births
1918 deaths
People of Pennsylvania in the American Civil War
Union Army officers
United States Army Medal of Honor recipients
American Civil War recipients of the Medal of Honor